Merkulayevka is a rural locality (a settlement) in Dakhovskoye Rural Settlement of Maykopsky District, Russia. The population was 52 as of 2018. There are 3 streets.

Geography 
The settlement is located in the valley of the Merkulayevka River, 47 km south of Tulsky (the district's administrative centre) by road. Novoprokhladnoye is the nearest rural locality.

References 

Rural localities in Maykopsky District